A trump is a playing card which is elevated above its usual rank in trick-taking games. Typically, an entire suit is nominated as a trump suit; these cards then outrank all cards of plain (non-trump) suits. In other contexts, the terms trump card or to trump refers to any sort of action, authority, or policy which automatically prevails over all others.

Etymology

The English word trump derives from trionfi, a type of 15th-century Italian playing cards, from the Latin triumphus "triumph, victory procession", ultimately (via Etruscan) from Greek θρίαμβος, the term for a hymn to Dionysus sung in processions in his honour.

Trionfi was the 15th-century card game for which tarot cards were designed. Trionfi were a fifth suit in the card game which acted as permanent trumps. Still in the 15th century, the French game triomphe (Spanish  triunfo) used four suits, one of which was randomly selected as trumps. It was this game that became extremely popular in Western Europe in the 16th century and is ancestral to many modern card games.

The English word is first documented in 1529 as the name of a card game which would develop into Ruff and Honours and ultimately Whist. 
In German, the term is attested as Triumph in 1541; the modern German spelling Trumpf is recorded from 1590.
In French, triomphe remained the name of the game, while the trump suit was called atout, from à tout (as it were "all-in"). Some European languages (Hungarian, Greek) adopted the French term. Russian козырь kozyr'  is of unknown etymology, possibly a loan from a Turkic source. Polish variously uses atut, trumf and kozer adopted from the French, German and Russian respectively.

Trump in card games
In most games, the relative rank of cards within a suit is the same in trump and plain suits, but they may sometimes differ, for example in Klabberjass, Euchre, or Eighty Points.

The trump suit may be fixed as in Spades, rotate on a fixed schedule or depend on the outcome of the previous hand as in Ninety-nine, be determined by drawing a card at random as in Bezique, by the last card dealt to a designated player as in Whist, by the first card played as in Nine Card Don, be chosen by a designated player as in Barbu, or players may bid for the right to select the trump suit as in Contract Bridge or Skat.

In most games, trump cards cannot be played if the player has any cards of the suit led to the trick; the requirement to "follow suit" is of higher priority. In a few games, trumps can be played at any time. Playing the first trump to an already-started trick is known as trumping or ruffing; if another player were to play a higher trump, that would be an overruff or overtrump.

The tarot deck contains a fifth suit, known in gaming as the atouts or honours and in occult circles as the Major Arcana, which serves as a permanent trump suit in games played with the tarot deck. The suit consists of twenty-two cards, including a Fool which serves as a highest trump (in Central Europe) or excuses the players from following suit elsewhere.

See also
Top Trumps
Trumps (card game)

References

Card game terminology
Playing cards